Yevgeni Aleksandrovich Menshov (19 February 1947 — 19 May 2015) was a Soviet and Russian actor and presenter. An actor of the Moscow Gogol Theatre, he was a Meritorious Artist of Russia (1993). For many years he was the host of the leading TV music festival Pesnya goda. People's Artist of Russia (2005).

Menshov died on 19 May 2015 at the age of 68 after a brief illness.

References

External links

Yevgeni Menishov at the kino-teatr.ru

1947 births
Soviet male actors
Russian male actors
Honored Artists of the Russian Federation
Recipients of the Order of Honour (Russia)
Soviet television presenters
Russian television presenters
Moscow Art Theatre School alumni
Burials in Troyekurovskoye Cemetery
Deaths from cancer in Russia
2015 deaths
Actors from Nizhny Novgorod